Fairlie is a Mackenzie District service town (or township) located in the Canterbury region of the South Island of New Zealand. The estimated population was  Being on state highway 8 between Christchurch (182 km, 2 hours 20 minutes drive) and Queenstown (300 km 3.5 hours drive), tourism is fast becoming a major industry within the town. Kimbell is 8 km west of Fairlie via state highway 8. Geraldine is 45 km east via state highway 79 and Timaru is 58 km southeast of Fairlie via state highway 8. Fairlie sits at an altitude of 301 metres above sea level.

From 1884 to 1968, the town was served by the Fairlie Branch railway, though until 1934, this branch line actually terminated a kilometre beyond Fairlie in Eversley.

Fairlie is commonly known as the gateway to the Mackenzie Basin. The town was initially called Fairlie's Creek, a name purportedly chosen by David Hamilton, the brother-in-law of James Lister (or Lizter), who had built a boarding house near the creek. The name Hamilton had been suggested, but was rejected due to similarity to the City of Hamilton in the North Island. David Hamilton suggested the town be named Fairlie after Fairlie, Scotland, which he had visited as part of his honeymoon. After 1892, the town's name was shortened to Fairlie.

The Opihi River runs past Fairlie.

Climate 

Fairlie has cool winters with an average high temperature of 9 degrees Celsius and an average low temperature of 2 degrees Celsius in July. Summers are warm with an average high temperature of 22 degrees Celsius and an average low temperature of 11 degrees Celsius in February. The wettest month of the year is December with an average of 66mm of rain and the driest is September with 50mm rain on average.

Demographics 
Fairlie is described by Statistics New Zealand as a rural settlement.

Fairlie had a population of 885 at the 2018 New Zealand census, an increase of 24 people (2.8%) since the 2013 census, and an increase of 18 people (2.1%) since the 2006 census. There were 378 households, with 384 occupied private dwellings and a further 93 unoccupied private dwellings. There were 435 males and 447 females, giving a sex ratio of 0.97 males per female. The median age was 47.3 years (compared with 37.4 years nationally), with 138 people (15.6%) aged under 15 years, 141 (15.9%) aged 15 to 29, 369 (41.7%) aged 30 to 64, and 234 (26.4%) aged 65 or older.

Ethnicities were 89.5% European/Pākehā, 7.8% Māori, 0.3% Pacific peoples, 5.8% Asian, and 1.4% other ethnicities (totals add to more than 100% since people could identify with multiple ethnicities).

The proportion of people born overseas was 20.3%, compared with 27.1% nationally.

Although some people objected to giving their religion, 45.4% had no religion, 44.4% were Christian, 0.7% were Buddhist and 1.4% had other religions.

Of those at least 15 years old, 105 (14.1%) people had a bachelor or higher degree, and 189 (25.3%) people had no formal qualifications. The median income was $25,700, compared with $31,800 nationally. 78 people (10.4%) earned over $70,000 compared to 17.2% nationally. The employment status of those at least 15 was that 348 (46.6%) people were employed full-time, 123 (16.5%) were part-time, and 6 (0.8%) were unemployed.

Opua statistical area
The Opua statistical area surrounds but does not include Fairlie.

Opua had a population of 1,347 at the 2018 New Zealand census, an increase of 84 people (6.7%) since the 2013 census, and an increase of 240 people (21.7%) since the 2006 census. There were 501 households. There were 726 males and 621 females, giving a sex ratio of 1.17 males per female. The median age was 40.0 years (compared with 37.4 years nationally), with 294 people (21.8%) aged under 15 years, 240 (17.8%) aged 15 to 29, 660 (49.0%) aged 30 to 64, and 153 (11.4%) aged 65 or older.

Ethnicities were 95.5% European/Pākehā, 6.0% Māori, 1.1% Pacific peoples, 2.0% Asian, and 1.6% other ethnicities (totals add to more than 100% since people could identify with multiple ethnicities).

The proportion of people born overseas was 12.9%, compared with 27.1% nationally.

Although some people objected to giving their religion, 49.7% had no religion, 41.0% were Christian, 0.7% were Hindu, 0.2% were Buddhist and 0.2% had other religions.

Of those at least 15 years old, 165 (15.7%) people had a bachelor or higher degree, and 192 (18.2%) people had no formal qualifications. The median income was $36,600, compared with $31,800 nationally. 171 people (16.2%) earned over $70,000 compared to 17.2% nationally. The employment status of those at least 15 was that 633 (60.1%) people were employed full-time, 198 (18.8%) were part-time, and 12 (1.1%) were unemployed.

Governance 
The Mackenzie District Council provide local government services to Fairlie. The Mackenzie District Council offices are located at 53 Main Street, Fairlie. Fairlie is part of the Waitaki electorate. Jacqui Dean of the National Party is the current member of parliament.

Education

Fairlie has three schools:

 Fairlie School is a state contributing primary (Year 1 to 6) school. It has  students as of 
 Mackenzie College is a state Year 7 to 13 secondary school. It has  students as of 
 Saint Joseph's School is a state-integrated Catholic full primary (Year 1 to 8) school. It has  students as of

Facilities and sports

Mackenzie agricultural and pastoral show 

Fairlie hosts the annual Mackenzie District Agricultural and Pastoral show every Easter Monday.  The first show was in 1899. The 100th edition ran in 1998. The show has been cancelled three times. Firstly in 1925 because of a polio epidemic, in 1943 due to WWII and 1948 due to an infantile paralysis epidemic.

Ski fields 
Fairlie is near the Two Thumb mountain range. There are two ski fields close located nearby. Mount Dobson Ski Field is 28 km drive from Fairlie, as is Fox Peak Ski Field.

Golf course 
The Fairlie Golf Club is an 18-hole golf course located on Talbot Street. The flat course has a 5526 metre long men's course with par being 70 and a 5017 metre long women's course with par being 72. The Fairlie 500 is a 72-hole tournament which is played on the third weekend of March each year. In April each year, the Glencairn ladies pairs tournament is held.

Rugby 

The Mackenzie rugby football club is based in Fairlie at Strathconan Park. It plays in all grades in the South Canterbury Rugby Union competitions. The Fairlie Creek Football Club was established in 1884 and played the rival Albury club two to three times each year initially. The Mackenzie sub union was formed in 1907 after the formation of the Cricklewood Club in 1907. Two other teams, Cave in 1911 and Alpine in 1912, also joined the Mackenzie sub union. After World War II, Tekapo and Pukaki also joined the Mackenzie sub union. In 1953, after the retirement of a number of players, the various clubs merged to form the Mackenzie rugby football club.

Swimming pool 
The Strathconan pool is located on School Road, Fairlie. It is open between October and March each year. The facility includes a 25-metre heated indoor swimming pool. Management of the pool was transferred from the Mackenzie District Council to Belgravia Leisure for the 2020–2021 season.

Ice skating 
The Fairlie Ice Rink is located between the Fairlie Domain and the Fairlie Campground. The ice rink is based on a man made pond and is reliant on cold weather which determines the length of the ice skating season. The location of the ice rink is two degrees Celsius colder than the town. The ice rink has been operating since the 1930s.

Half marathon
The Mackenzie Half-Marathon which first ran in July 2020 starts in Fairlie. 355 runners competed. The second edition ran in July 2021. The course includes a river crossing.

Skateboarding
A$100,000 skateboard park was proposed for Fairlie. It was finished in early 2021 and would have cost the community significantly more had not 1200 hours of work been completed by local volunteers.

Fairlie heritage museum 

The Fairlie heritage museum contains a collection of farm machinery, as well as many buildings including the old railway station. The Fairlie Heritage Museum has one of the biggest vintage wagon and carriage collections in the country.

Notable residents 
Jack Lovelock lived in Fairlie between 1919 and 1923. He was dux of the primary section of Fairlie School. The Jack Lovelock memorial track is an eight kilometre walking trail in Fairlie, named in his honour.

Notable buildings 
The Gladstone Grand Hotel is a category two listed building built in 1884.

The Mount Cook Line building (which were formerly stables dating from 1906). This category two building was listed in 1984.

Fairlie is known for its pies produced at the Fairlie Bakehouse. 

There are two church buildings, St Columba on Main Street and St Stephen's on Kirke Street. They are part of Mackenzie Cooperating Parish, an ecumenical parish. Saint Patrick and All Saints Catholic Church is located at 7 Gall Street.

In 2017, Westpac closed their Fairlie branch which left the town without a bank.

References

External links

Mackenzie District
Populated places in Canterbury, New Zealand